The original 1835 edition of the Doctrine and Covenants, a book of LDS scripture, used code names for certain people and places. These names appear only in seven of the book's sections, mainly those dealing with the United Order (or United Firm). It is believed that their purpose was to avoid the use of these sections in lawsuits by opponents of the Church, since giving the real names might have provided evidence that the United Order was legally a company, with its members financially liable for each other and the whole Order.

The substituted names appear in sections 78, 82, 92, 96, 103, 104, and 105. The earliest is dated 1 March 1832, the last is dated 22 June 1834. All except 103 and 105 were printed in the 1835 edition, and all seven appear in the editions  published from 1844 to 1869 with the pseudonyms alone printed. In the 1876 and 1921 LDS editions, the real names were published in parentheses following the code names, and the 1981 LDS edition printed only the real names. The Community of Christ edition still uses the code names, with a key to their identities suggested in the section headings.

Code names for people
 Ahashdah: Newel K. Whitney
 Alam: Edward Partridge
 Baneemy: originally Lyman Wight, reinterpreted by Orson Pratt as "mine elders" in 1876, perhaps corrupt Hebrew for “my sons”; also claimed as a title by Charles B. Thompson
 Baurak Ale: Joseph Smith. Possibly Hebrew for barakh 'el (ברך אל) “blessed [of] El,” i.e., God.
 Enoch: Joseph Smith
 Gazelam: Joseph Smith (cf. Gazelem)
 Horah: John Whitmer
 Mahalaleel: Algernon Sidney Gilbert
 Mehemson: Martin Harris
 Olihah: Oliver Cowdery (see -ihah)
 Pelagoram: Sidney Rigdon
 Shalemanasseh: William Wines Phelps (cf. Shalmaneser, Manasseh)
 Shederlaomach: Frederick G. Williams (cf. Chedorlaomer, Shedolamak)
 Zombre: John Johnson

Other code words
 Cainhannoch: New York (cf. Enoch son of Cain)
 Lane-shine-house: printing office
 Ozondah: mercantile store
 Shinehah: Kirtland, Ohio (a word for the sun used in the Book of Abraham see also -hah)
 Shinelah: print
 Shinelane: printing
 Shule: ashery
 Tahhanes: tannery (cf. Tahpanhes)
 United Firm: United Order

References

Doctrine and Covenants
Code names
Latter Day Saint movement lists